Surni-ye Sofla (also Romanized as Sūrnī-ye Soflá, Soorenié Sofla, and Sūrenī-ye Soflá; also known as Sūrīni, Sūrīnī-ye Soflá, and Sūrnī-ye Pā'īn) is a village in Razavar Rural District, in the Central District of Kermanshah County, Kermanshah Province, Iran. At the 2006 census, its population was 248, in 56 families.

References 

Populated places in Kermanshah County